In finite field theory, a branch of mathematics, a primitive polynomial is the minimal polynomial of a primitive element of the finite field .

Properties
 Because all minimal polynomials are irreducible, all primitive polynomials are also irreducible.

 A primitive polynomial must have a non-zero constant term, for otherwise it will be divisible by x.

 Over GF(p) there are exactly  primitive polynomials of degree m, where φ is Euler's totient function.

 A primitive polynomial of degree m has m different roots in GF(pm), which all have order .

 The primitive polynomial F(x) of degree m of a primitive element α in GF(pm) has explicit form .

Usage

Field element representation
Primitive polynomials can be used to represent the elements of a finite field.  If α in GF(pm) is a root of a primitive polynomial F(x), then the nonzero elements of GF(pm) are represented as successive powers of α:

This allows an economical representation in a computer of the nonzero elements of the finite field, by representing an element by the corresponding exponent of  This representation makes multiplication easy, as it corresponds to addition of exponents modulo

Pseudo-random bit generation
Primitive polynomials over GF(2), the field with two elements, can be used for pseudorandom bit generation.

In general, for a primitive polynomial of degree m over GF(2), this process will generate  pseudo-random bits before repeating the same sequence.

CRC codes
The cyclic redundancy check (CRC) is an error-detection code that operates by interpreting the message bitstring as the coefficients of a polynomial over GF(2) and dividing it by a fixed generator polynomial also over GF(2); see Mathematics of CRC.

Primitive trinomials
A useful class of primitive polynomials is the primitive trinomials, those having only three nonzero terms: .  Their simplicity makes for particularly small and fast linear-feedback shift registers.  A number of results give techniques for locating and testing primitiveness of trinomials.

For polynomials over GF(2), where  is a Mersenne prime, a polynomial of degree r is primitive if and only if it is irreducible. Primes have no non-trivial factors.) Although the Mersenne Twister pseudo-random number generator does not use a trinomial, it does take advantage of this.

This can be used to create a pseudo-random number generator of the huge period  ≈ .

References

External links
 

Field (mathematics)
Polynomials